Taylor Townsend was the defending champion, but lost in the first round to Sesil Karatantcheva.

Kristína Kučová won the title, defeating Lauren Davis in the final, 3–6, 7–6(11–9), 6–2.

Seeds

Draw

Finals

Top half

Bottom half

References

Main Draw

Hardee's Pro Classic - Singles
Hardee's Pro Classic